Hrvatski Idol was the Croatian version of Pop Idol. There have been two seasons of Hrvatski Idol. The first one was won by Žanamari Lalić who received 54% of the vote in the final night. Patrick Jurdić won the second season with 50.22% of the vote in the final. Since the number of received phonecalls was only 2.296, Jurdić won with not more than 10 votes over runner-up Lidija Bačić. Both winners did try out on other countries similar casting shows before: Lalić in Germany and Jurdić in both his home country Austria and the Czech Republic. However, both failed to achieve some success on their first tries and were eliminated pretty early in the competition.

Although season one being successful with viewers, the sophomore series failed to continue this success. Third season was delayed and after an absence of four years the show returned to Croatian screens under the new name Hrvatska traži zvijezdu on RTL Televizija.

Season 1

Hosts

 Nikolina Božić
 Vinko Štefanac

Judges

 Đorđe Novković
 Miroslav Škoro
 Ivanka Boljkovac
 Nikša Bratoš

Auditions

 Rijeka (03/17/04)
 Split
 Osijek
 Zagreb

Finalists
(ages stated at time of contest)

Finals Elimination Chart

Season 2

Hosts

 Nikolina Božić
 Predrag Šuka

Judges

 Zrinko Tutić
 Goran Karan
 Ricardo Luque
 Marija Husar

Auditions

 Split (10/31/04)
 Osijek (11/07/04)
 Opatija (11/14/04)
 Zagreb (11/21/04)

Finalists
(ages stated at time of contest)

Finals Elimination Chart

References

External links

Croatian popular music
Croatian reality television series
Idols (franchise)
2004 Croatian television series debuts
2005 Croatian television series endings
Television series by Fremantle (company)
Non-British television series based on British television series
Nova TV (Croatia) original programming